Clarissa Bowers (born October 27, 1997) is an American model. In 2020, Bowers was featured in the Sports Illustrated Swimsuit Issue as a Swim Search finalist. After winning America's Miss World 2017 she  represented the United States at Miss World 2017.

Career
In 2017, Bowers transferred to Vanderbilt University where she is completing a degree in Neuroscience. In 2019, she was selected by Sports Illustrated to walk in their Miami Swim Week show and she made her Sports Illustrated Swim debut in the 2020 issue of the magazine.

Pageantry
Bowers was crowned America's Miss World 2017 on August 13, 2017 and she competed at the Miss World 2017 pageant held on November 18, 2017 in Sanya, China and received the accolade of Judge's Choice ranking her in the Top 40.

References

Living people
1997 births
American beauty pageant winners
Miss World America
Miss World 2017 delegates